PK Partizan or Plivački Klub Partizan is a swimming club from Belgrade, Serbia. The club is part of the sports society JSD Partizan. It was founded in 1945 and is a member of the Serbian Swimming Association.

The club participates in various tournaments.

Notable Affiliates
Olympic Medalist Milorad Čavić
 Two-time junior European champion Velimir Stjepanović

References

External links 
 

Sport in Belgrade
Sports clubs established in 1945